Ain't Nobody Got Time for That is a viral YouTube video of Kimberly "Sweet Brown" Wilkins being interviewed after having escaped a fire in an apartment complex. It originally aired on April 8, 2012, on Oklahoma City NBC affiliate KFOR-TV. In a slightly modified version broadcast on Jimmy Kimmel Live, it was edited as if she was being interviewed by Jesus himself.

The video garnered Sweet Brown many appearances on television, including a visit to ABC's The View. Brown also plays a cameo role in the Tyler Perry 2013 movie A Madea Christmas saying a part of her line from her television interview during an interview at the end of the movie.  As of June 2021, the original videos uploaded at the time have a combined total of 34.5 million views.

Critical analysis
Charles E. Williams, writing for the Huffington Post, opined that the humor evoked by Sweet Brown's interview should stay within the confines of the black community, linking it to the  "code-switching" phenomenon W. E. B. Du Bois spoke of.

Lawsuit
In April 2013, Sweet Brown sued Apple for selling a song called "I Got Bronchitis" on iTunes for profit, using catchphrases uttered by her in the video, such as "Ain't nobody got time for that", "Ran for my life," and "Said oh, Lord Jesus, it's a fire!" She also sued Facebook for 3.8 million dollars for unauthorized use of copyright material.

Jimmy Kimmel parody
In March 2014, variety show Jimmy Kimmel Live did a parody of the video in the style of a film trailer. The plot is Sweet Brown going through some moments in history and being responsible for things such as Barack Obama getting into politics and Steve Jobs founding Apple. It starred Queen Latifah as Sweet Brown, Barkhad Abdi as Barack Obama and Adam Driver as Steve Jobs. In the end, it features Matt Damon doing an interview when the real Sweet Brown comes in and interrupts him with her catchphrase. As of April 2017, it had over 10 million views on YouTube.

References

External links 

2010s English-language films
2012 YouTube videos
2012 in Oklahoma
Internet memes introduced in 2012
Oklahoma culture
Oklahoma City